Cabin Fever Media is a design studio founded in 1999 by original Dark Tranquillity guitarist, Niklas Sundin.

Cabin Fever Media specializes in graphic design of album artwork, however, Cabin Fever Media also does various other commissioned work that involves illustration and design such as T-shirt design, logo creation, image editing and retouching, typesetting, photography, web design (HTML and DHTML, Flash), and multimedia presentations.

Cabin Fever Media has designed artwork for many notable bands, including Arch Enemy, In Flames, Nightrage, At the Gates, Dark Tranquillity, Sentenced, Moonspell and Soilwork. Also, ever since its creation, Cabin Fever Media has designed all the artwork for Niklas Sundin's own band Dark Tranquillity.

References

External links
 Cabin Fever Media – official website

Design companies established in 1999
Design companies of Sweden
1999 establishments in Sweden